The 1922 All-Ireland Senior Football Championship Final was the 35th All-Ireland Final and the deciding match of the 1922 All-Ireland Senior Football Championship, an inter-county Gaelic football tournament for the top teams in Ireland.

Dublin defeated Galway.

Sligo had qualified but were ejected in spectacular circumstances, and also stripped of their Connacht title (given instead to Galway).

Pre-match
This was Galway's second appearance in an All-Ireland football final following their first appearance (a loss to Kildare) in 1919. They would not win the All-Ireland football title until 1925.

Galway were lucky to have even been there in the first place. Sligo had won that year's Connacht Senior Football Championship, defeating Roscommon, Mayo and Galway, before disposing of Tipperary in their subsequent All-Ireland semi-final meeting. However, "a flimsy technicality" led to a replay of the Galway versus Sligo Connacht final, which Sligo lost. Galway were now Connacht champions and elevated into the All-Ireland Senior Football Final at Sligo's expense. Sligo were left with ... nothing.

Match summary
Dublin won by six points to four, their captain Paddy Carey scoring the final point from a 50-yard kick.

It was the second of three All-Ireland football titles won by Dublin in the 1920s, which made them joint "team of the decade" with Kerry who also won three.

References

All-Ireland Senior Football Championship Final
All-Ireland Senior Football Championship Final, 1922
All-Ireland Senior Football Championship Finals
Dublin county football team matches
Galway county football team matches